Gephyrothuriidae is a family of sea cucumbers belonging to the order Persiculida.

Genera
Two genera are recognised in the family Gephyrothuriidae:
 Gephyrothuria Koehler & Vaney, 1905
 Paroriza Hérouard, 1902

References

Persiculida
Echinoderm families